Grégory Wimbée (born 19 August 1971) is a French retired footballer who played as a goalkeeper.

He appeared in 282 Ligue 1 games over 11 seasons, representing in the competition Nancy, Lille, Metz, Grenoble and Valenciennes. In a 19-year professional career, he added 297 matches in Ligue 2.

Club career
Wimbée was born in Essey-lès-Nancy, Meurthe-et-Moselle. After graduating from AS Nancy's youth system and serving a loan to Ligue 2 side OFC Charleville, he became an undisputed starter for the former, helping them achieve promotion to Ligue 1. On 28 November 1996, in his first top flight season, he scored a last-minute goal from a corner, in a 1–1 home draw against RC Lens, becoming the first goalkeeper to have scored in the competition's history.

After an unassuming year with AS Cannes, Wimbée moved to Lille OSC, achieving another promotion and later qualifying to the 2001–02 edition of the UEFA Champions League, the first-ever participation in the competition for the Nord-Pas de Calais club. During six seasons, he was an automatic first choice.

After two seasons and a further 67 first division matches with FC Metz, Wimbée joined Grenoble Foot 38 in 2006. He made 36 appearances in 2007–08, as the campaign again ended in promotion and the team returned to the top flight after a 45-year absence.

On 28 August 2009, the 38-year-old Wimbée signed a one-year deal with fellow league club Valenciennes FC. During the season, which ended with a tenth-place finish, he played only once, in a 1–3 home loss against FC Toulouse on 16 January 2010, renewing his contract in July for one more year.

After no additional league appearances, Wimbée retired from professional football in June 2011, two months shy of his 40th birthday.

References

External links

Stats at ASNL Story 

1971 births
Living people
French footballers
Association football goalkeepers
Ligue 1 players
Ligue 2 players
AS Nancy Lorraine players
OFC Charleville players
AS Cannes players
Lille OSC players
FC Metz players
Grenoble Foot 38 players
Valenciennes FC players
Competitors at the 1993 Mediterranean Games
Mediterranean Games medalists in football
Mediterranean Games bronze medalists for France